Maria Cristina Russo is a Director for Global Approach & International Partnerships at the Directorate-General for Research and Innovation of the European Commission. She has been in a similar role since 2013. Before that she had been Head of Unit for Policy Coordination, Relations with the European Parliament and the European Council and Member of Cabinet of European Commissioner Philippe Busquin.

Director for International Cooperation in Research & Innovation  

In April 2014 Russo organized the Japan participation conference in Tokyo to invite Japanese firms to the Horizon 2020, research and innovation EU program from 2014 to 2020. In February 2017 she visited Autonomous University of Barcelona in collaboration with Union for the Mediterranean to present the Quintuple Helix Approach to Targeted Open Innovation in Energy, Water and Agriculture in the South Mediterranean Neighborhood (5TOI_4EWAS).

On 28 April 2020 Russo opened virtual event of the Africa-Europe Innovation Partnership (AEIP) with objective to start and deepen cooperation between the tech hubs. On 8 June 2020 she co-chaired video conference of the EU-Russia Joint Science and Technology Cooperation Committee focused on the implementation of flagship initiatives and joint priority projects, mainly related to research infrastructure, health and civil aeronautics.

Education 

In 1990 Russo graduated from Luiss Guido Carli University (Political Science and Government) in Rome, in 1992 from College of Europe (EU Administration), and in 1996 she completed Law Studies at Sapienza University of Rome.

See also 
Directorate-General for Research and Innovation
Horizon 2020

References

External links 
Ms Maria Cristina Russo – Director, International Cooperation – European Commission
Maria Cristina Russo, Directrice Coopération Internationale, Commission Européenne
Maria Cristina Russo in visita alla mostra Orizzonte Mare

Libera Università Internazionale degli Studi Sociali Guido Carli alumni
College of Europe alumni
Sapienza University of Rome alumni
Year of birth missing (living people)
Living people